Pseudeutreta paragranum is a species of tephritid or fruit flies in the genus Pseudeutreta of the family Tephritidae.

Distribution
Argentina.

References

Tephritinae
Diptera of South America
Insects described in 1942